Thomas Andrew Barnett (12 December 1936 – 15 March 2022) was an English professional footballer who played as a winger.

Career
Barnett made 14 appearances in the Football League for Crystal Palace between 1958 and 1961, and he also played non-league football for Chatham Town, Margate and Romford. After playing for Bexley United, he became player-manager at St Albans City. He later managed Hoddesdon Town and Hertford Town.

After football
After retiring from football, Barnett became a publican and owned his own brewery in Sawbridgeworth. Barnett died on 15 March 2022, at the age of 85.

References

External links

1936 births
2022 deaths
People from Muswell Hill
English footballers
Association football midfielders
English Football League players
Barnet F.C. players
Chatham Town F.C. players
Crystal Palace F.C. players
Margate F.C. players
Romford F.C. players
Bexley United F.C. players
St Albans City F.C. players
English football managers
St Albans City F.C. managers
Hoddesdon Town F.C. managers
Hertford Town F.C. managers